"Fly Like Me" is a song by American rapper Chingy. It is the first single from his fourth album Hate It or Love It (2007). It features singer Amerie and has, in Chingy's words, a "mainstream feel" similar to that of the 2005 single "Pimpin' All Over the World" by rapper Ludacris, who was originally to have been featured on the song alongside singer Rihanna. The song was released on November 13, 2007 but was a commercial failure as it stalled at number 89 on the Billboard Hot 100, however it went to number 40 on the Hot R&B/Hip-Hop Songs chart. From October 12, "Fly like Me" was available for streaming on Def Jam Recordings' official website. "Fly Like Me" remains Chingy's last song on any Billboard chart.

Charts

References

2007 singles
2007 songs
Chingy songs
Amerie songs
Def Jam Recordings singles
Songs written by Amerie
Songs written by LT Moe
Songs written by Ludacris